Machh, or Mach (Balochi, Brahui, Sindhi: مڄ), is a town and union council of Kachhi District in the Balochistan province of Pakistan. The town has an altitude of 1006 metres (3303 feet) and is located at 29°52'0N 67°19'60E, - some about 50 km (70 km by road) southeast of Quetta, the provincial capital.

Geography 
Machh is located in between the stony hills. It is divided into 3 parts; area for jail, railway and town. There is only one bazaar.

Demography

Languages 
Main languages are Balochi, Brahui and Sindhi.

Religion

Economy 
Most of the economic activity in Machh revolves around coal mines and the buying and selling of coal. The major source of employment is the public sector - Railway, Jail, Wapda, Sui Gas and Levies Force. Machh town has a market that caters to coal miners and residents. Mach has a jail, built in 1929.

Weather 
The climate is  dry. It rains 3 or 4 times in a year. Machh experiences extreme winter and summer temperatures. The winter of 2016 saw heavy snowfall along the Kolpur and Kohebash areas of Machh.

Transportation 
People use cars, bikes and cycles for transportation in town. Pakistan National Highway N-65 runs along Tehsil Machh and is the only major road in the area.

References

 Saulat Mirza Hanged in Macch Jail Baluchistan

Populated places in Kachhi District
Union councils of Balochistan, Pakistan